The 2018–19 Delaware Fightin' Blue Hens men's basketball team represented the University of Delaware during the 2018–19 NCAA Division I men's basketball season. The Fightin' Blue Hens, led by third-year head coach Martin Ingelsby, played their home games at the Bob Carpenter Center in Newark, Delaware as members of the Colonial Athletic Association.

Previous season 
The Fightin' Blue Hens finished the 2017–18 season 14–19, 6–12 in CAA play to finish in a four-way tie for seventh place. They defeated Elon in the first round of the CAA tournament before losing in the quarterfinals to Northeastern.

Offseason

Departures

Incoming transfers

Under NCAA transfer rules, Darling and Mutts will have to sit out for the 2018–19 season. Will have three years of remaining eligibility.

Recruiting class of 2018

Recruiting class of 2019

Roster

Schedule and results

|-
!colspan=9 style=| Non-conference regular season

|-
!colspan=9 style=| CAA regular season

|-
!colspan=9 style=| CAA tournament

Source:

References

Delaware Fightin' Blue Hens men's basketball seasons
Delaware
Delaware Fightin' Blue Hens men's b
Delaware Fightin' Blue Hens men's b